Baltimore Talent Development High School was a public high school located in Harlem Park, Baltimore, Maryland, United States. It was situated in a crime-ridden, low-income and working-class neighborhood of Baltimore. The school was geared toward ensuring these high-risk potential dropouts graduate with the honed abilities to succeed in college.  It was voted to be closed by the Baltimore school board in 2014.

References

External links 

 
 Maryland Report Card - Baltimore Talent Development High School

Harlem Park, Baltimore
Public schools in Baltimore
Public high schools in Maryland
Charter schools in Maryland
Defunct schools in Maryland
Working-class culture in Baltimore